The 2011 Asian Winter Games, officially known as the 7th Asian Winter Games, was a winter multi-sport event held in Astana and Almaty, Kazakhstan, from January 30 and to February 6, 2011. A total of 991 athletes representing 26 National Olympic Committees (NOCs) participated in these games, competing in 69 events from 11 different sports and disciplines.

Athletes from 8 NOCs won at least one medal, the most ever at any Asian Winter Games and athletes from 4 of these NOCs secured at least one gold. For the first time Kazakhstan led the medal table in its Asian Games history, with 32 golds and overall 70 medals. In doing so, it also broke the record for the most golds won by a NOC at a single Asian Winter Games (the previous was 29, set by the Japan in 1986). Kazakhstan's previous best was second place in 1996 in Harbin, China, with 14 gold medals, only one behind China. Athletes from Iran and Kyrgyzstan won the first Asian Winter Games medals for their nations.

Medal table

The ranking in this table is consistent with International Olympic Committee convention in its published medal tables. By default, the table is ordered by the number of gold medals the athletes from a nation have won (in this context, a nation is an entity represented by a National Olympic Committee). The number of silver medals is taken into consideration next and then the number of bronze medals. If nations are still tied, equal ranking is given; they are listed alphabetically by IOC country code.

Medal distribution

Notes and references
Note

There are sources, that display variations in the number of total participating nations, but Indonesia didn't send any athlete but an official who marched with a flag of Indonesia, so number of NOCs which sent athletes to the Games were 26, not 27. 

References
General

Specific

External links
Official website of the Games
Asian Winter Games 2011 – Opening Ceremony at YouTube.

Medal table
2011